NAC Breda, often simply known as NAC, is a Dutch professional football club, based in Breda, Netherlands. NAC Breda play in the Rat Verlegh Stadium, named after their most important player, Antoon 'Rat' Verlegh. They play in the Eerste Divisie. In their history, NAC won one national title in 1921 and won one Cup in 1973.

NAC was founded on 19 September 1912, when the two clubs ADVENDO and NOAD merged to one club, both being abbreviations of their respective full names.

In 2012 Stefaan Eskes succeeded Ed Busselaar and in August 2012 NAC Breda reinstated their first logo as the new club logo for the 2012–13 season.

Name and etymology
NAC is a fusion of the two abbreviations of the two clubs that merged to create it in 1912, NOAD and ADVENDO.
 
NOAD is a Dutch abbreviation for Nooit Opgeven, Altijd Doorzetten (English translation: Never give up, always persevere), while ADVENDO is a Dutch abbreviation for Aangenaam Door Vermaak En Nuttig Door Ontspanning (English: Pleasant for its entertainment and useful for its relaxation). The C stands for Combinatie (combination). 

The full name of NAC Breda expands to Nooit opgeven altijd doorzetten, Aangenaam door vermaak en nuttig door ontspanning, Combinatie Breda.

Early in 2003 NAC added Breda to their club name as a symbol of gratitude after the City of Breda bought NAC's Rat Verleghstadium to help the club cope with financial problems.

History

Foundation
NAC Breda was founded on 20 September 1912 when the clubs ADVENDO and NOAD merged. During the new club's foundation meeting the atmosphere became tense, since NOAD wanted to name the new club NOAD (NOad and ADvendo). This name was not acceptable to ADVENDO and eventually Frans Konert proposed to call the club NAC (NOAD ADVENDO Combinatie), which was accepted by the meeting's attendants. At first, the NVB refused to let NAC play association football, but on 28 October 1912 allowed NAC to play in the 2nd Southern Division.

NAC's golden ages

The first years were not very successful for NAC, but after moving to a new stadium ‘t Ploegske, results improved. NAC became one of the top teams in the top Southern Division, becoming champions of the 1919 season, earning NAC the right to play the Dutch Champions’ Competition (a small competition in which the champions from the regional divisions would play for the Dutch title). In this competition, NAC finished in last place. In 1920, NAC were one of the first clubs to play international matches. NAC played a couple of friendly matches, including a match against Real Madrid CF, winning 4-0 and the Spanish newspapers called NAC ‘Los muchacos del Breda, maestros del futbol’ (English: The boys from Breda, masters in football). In 1921, NAC celebrated one of its greatest achievements, becoming Dutch football champions. In the Dutch Championship competition, NAC defeated Ajax, Be Quick 1887 and Go Ahead. NAC continued to excel, being considered to be one of the best clubs in Dutch football during the 20’s and 30’s. During this period they won 6 Southern Division titles and their play style was deemed technically perfect by press and the public.

Because of this view, the NAC board decided to hire a professional trainer. Englishman Ben Affleck was hired as a coach and was a couple of months later was succeeded by James Moore. After Moore resigned, the NAC board issued a committee, who would select the best 11 NAC players to play in a match. In 1931 Antoon Verlegh retired from football. Verlegh, nowadays a club icon for NAC, played for them since their foundation. In this year, NAC also had a dispute with the city of Breda. The stadium's terrain ‘t Ploegske was classed as a residential area, meaning NAC had to leave the ground. As no other option was available in Breda, NAC were forced to move to the town Princenhage. Within two months, a complete new stadium, with a capacity of 5,500 people, was built and NAC left Breda. In 1935, NAC became the first club in the Netherlands to travel via airplane to an away match against GVAV.

In 1939, NAC and Breda reopened discussions on whether they could return to the city. Breda’s  council zoned a large piece of land at the Beatrixstraat as stadium area and NAC returned to Breda in 1940. Because of the breakout of the Second World War, NAC decided to play an important social function in Breda's community. In order to divert the people's attention from war, NAC organized sport events, theatre, fairs and horsing games. Although NAC continued to play football, several players were employed by the Germans in Germany. During the Second World War, youngster Kees Rijvers made his debut for NAC.

Challenging times
After the Second World War, NAC played in the highest level. In 1949 Chairman of Honour C.J. Asselbergs died. Asselbergs was one of the people who were present at NAC since NAC got founded. In 1954 professional football was introduced in the Netherlands. The running competitions were postponed and new competitions were created. NAC entered the 1A League and became champions of this league in 1955. In the championship competition NAC finished second place, behind their rivals Willem II Tilburg.

On 14 March 1960 Breda was shocked to hear the death of Antoon ‘De Rat’ Verlegh. Verlegh, considered to be one of the important persons in Dutch football, died in a car accident on 12 March. From NAC's foundation in 1912, Verlegh was involved in the club at numerous positions and played an important role with the Royal Dutch Football Association. In November 1961 NAC lost another important person; Chairman Jacques Piederiet died. A year later, in August 1962, chairman Le Fevre died. The beginning of the sixties were not bright for NAC. In 1964–1965 NAC even relegated for the first time in its existence.

The relegation meant a total reconstruction of the club's management. The board resigned and NAC's intention was to return to the highest level within one year. NAC was successful in this and a season later NAC played in the highest level and a year later qualified for the KNVB Cup’s final, where it lost to AFC Ajax. Although NAC lost, the club was allowed to play UEFA Cup. In the UEFA Cup NAC reached the second round, after defeating Floriana FC. In the second round NAC was knocked out by Cardiff City. Although NAC remained in the highest football level in the Netherlands, NAC were in a heavy struggle not to relegate. 31 May 1973 is another highlight in NAC's history. In the KNVB Cup final, NAC played NEC Nijmegen. NAC won the Final 2-0. Because of their success, NAC was allowed to play in the UEFA Cup Winners' Cup. In the first round, NAC was knocked out by eventual winners 1. FC Magdeburg.

The birth of the Avondje NAC
In 1975 the NAC board decided to play the home matches on a Saturday evening. In this period a group of fanatic NAC fans merged and located themselves on a stand. Their fierce support lead to an attraction of youngsters, who also fanatically support NAC. This fierce support lasts till now and is known in the Netherlands as an Avondje NAC (English; An Evening NAC). An Avondje NAC is a flamboyant mix of Burgundian fun, beer, fanaticism and love for the club and ensures that during home matches the atmosphere in the stadium is intimidating. On 6 October 1979, a strange situation occurred. During the home match against NAC's rivals Feyenoord the linesman was hit by an ashtray. The referee postponed the match, riots broke out and the incident in the Netherlands is known as the ‘Ashtray Incident’.

In the eighties NAC relegated two times. After the second relegation, it appeared the financial situation of NAC was terrible. NAC was almost bankrupt and had to sell its belongings to survive. For years NAC struggled to survive, but at the end of the eighties NAC's situation improved and the club began to play in the top of the Eerste Divisie. On 7 June 1989, NAC player Andro Knel died in a plane accident. It was a shock to the club, especially since Knel was one of the popular players. Hundreds of fans of both NAC Breda and Sparta Rotterdam, Knel's former club, came together in memorial of Knel. A temporary Knel monument was revealed and the numbers of supporters visiting the monument proved his popularity. Due to the sad moments of Knel's death a special relationship between fans of NAC and Sparta was created.

After Knel's death, NAC had to continue to play in de Eerste Divisie and three times NAC was close to promote back to the Eredivisie. In 1992, NAC finally promoted to the Eredivisie. With a team managed by Ronald Spelbos and players like John Lammers, Pierre van Hooijdonk, Ton Lokhoff, Fabian Wilnis and John Karelse, NAC played their promotion match in Den Bosch against FC Den Bosch in front of 9,000 NAC fans. The promotion meant a revival of NAC's popularity, the stadium was sold out and NAC was supported by thousands of people in away matches. In the away match against their rivals Feyenoord in Rotterdam, NAC was supported by 8,000 people. Due to the popularity, the NAC board announced it would leave the stadium at the Beatrixstraat and it would build a new stadium. Until the movement, NAC continued to play in the highest level, missed qualification for the UEFA Cup several times and reached the semi-finals of the KNVB Cup.

A new stadium and continuing financial problems
 In 1996 NAC moved to their new stadium, the FUJIFILM Stadium. With the move NAC indicated it wanted to play in Europe on a regular basis. In 1998, club youngster Dominique Diroux died from a heart attack during a match between the reserve teams of NAC and AZ. NAC’s new players couldn't meet the club’s raised expectations for a couple of seasons; NAC were even relegated in 1999. After this, it appeared that NAC's financial situation was again in peril. In 4 seasons, NAC bought 60 players and the costs of the new stadium exceeded their budget. In order to save the club, the stadium was bought from NAC by investors and Roelant Oltmans was appointed as the team’s first professional manager. Also, a fans’ council, the first in Holland , was established, where fans have an advisory role that protects NAC's culture and defend fan interests. NAC also has a position available to a fan in the board of chairmen.

NAC professionalized and were promoted in 2000 to the Eredivisie. In 2003, NAC qualified for the UEFA Cup, playing two matches against Newcastle United. An estimated 4,300 NAC fans travelled to Newcastle to support their team. In 2003 it appeared NAC again neared bankruptcy, but the City of Breda purchased the stadium again from NAC on 30 January 2003. As gratitude, NAC modified their name to become NAC Breda, honouring the city’s consistent contributions towards helping the club during difficult times After another financial rescue, the management and the Board of Chairmen resigned, being succeeded by Theo Mommers as managing director and a new Board of Chairmen, led by Willem van der Hoeven. In 2006 NAC decided to rename the stadium to Rat Verlegh Stadion.

For a long time, NAC's financial position appeared stable as the club finished third in the 2007–2008 Eredivisie. In 2009, NAC qualified for the UEFA Europa League. In the 4th round, NAC was defeated by Villarreal CF with scores of  1–3 (home) and 6–1 (away). Despite earlier denials towards fans and stakeholders by management and the Board of Chairmen, it appeared at the end of season 2009–2010 that NAC's financial position was once again unstable. The club lost €3.2 million that season, due to rebuilding the stadium and buying expensive players. Board members Willem van der Hoeven, Jacques Visschers and Bas Koomans resigned and Bas van Bavel became new chairman. Managing director Theo Mommers reported ill in April 2010. Bernard Ouwerkerk was appointed in June 2010 as the club’s interim managing director, while Technical Manager Earnest Stewart signed a contract at AZ and was replaced by Jeffrey van As.
During this period, NAC manager Maaskant raised his concerns several times to the press. Because of the financial problems, NAC had to cut its budget, meaning Maaskant was not able to buy new players. On 21 August 2010, NAC and Maaskant made public that the trainer would leave the club for Polish football club Wisła Kraków, where he signed a two-year deal. His assistant managers John Karelse, Gert Aandewiel and Arno van Zwam became the interim managers for NAC Breda. In January 2011, Bernard Ouwerkerk resigned and was succeeded by Ed Busselaar. In March 2011 it appeared that NAC had a debt of €7.1 million.

Relegation and Eerste Divisie (2015–2017)
After a few seasons of struggle to stay clear of relegation, NAC couldn't avoid relegation after the 2014/15 season, when they were beaten by Roda JC in a promotion/relegation playoff final. They had enjoyed 15 successive seasons in the top tier.

Return to Eredivisie (2017–2019)
On 28 May 2017, NAC returned to the Eredivisie after winning the promotion/relegation play-off final against NEC Nijmegen (1–0 and 1–4). Cyriel Dessers scored four goals in those two matches. The other goal was made by Giovanni Korte. After the match there were festivities in Breda. First there was a party next to the stadium. A day later the party continued at the "Grote Markt". On 12 May 2019, in a defeat to SC Heerenveen they relegated to the Keuken Kampioen Divisie.

Honours

National
 National Championship
 Winners (1):  1920–21
 KNVB Cup
 Winners (1):  1972–73
 Eerste Divisie
 Winners (1):  1999–2000
 Promoted (1): 2016–17
 Eerste Klasse
 Winners (9):  1919, 1921, 1922, 1924, 1925, 1927, 1936, 1946, 1955

Invitational
 Tournoi de Pâques
 Winners (1):  1925

Domestic results
Below is a table with NAC Breda's domestic results since the introduction of the Eredivisie in 1956.

Colours and crest

Colours
NAC's official colours are yellow, white and black. During their existence these colours have always been in NAC's home and/or away kit.

Initially, NAC's home kit was a black shirt -with a diagonal yellow line-, a white short and yellow black socks. In 1916 NAC changed this kit towards a white shirt. This white shirt would remain till the sixties when NAC decided to replace the white shirt with a yellow shirt and black shorts Conversely, NAC's away colours have been very inconsistent. There is no setting in the colour standards.
In NAC cultural manifest it has been stated that the home and away kits should have the official NAC colours. Afterwards, NAC announced to play their home matches in a yellow shirt, with a black diagonal line running over it, black shorts and white socks, with some yellow accents in it. The away kit is a white shirt, with a yellow diagonal line marked by a black border running over it. White short and white socks complete the away kit.

Crest
During their existence, NAC had 4 different crests. After their foundation in 1912, their crest was a black shield, with a yellow diagonal line running over it and in it the letters N.A.C.. This crest was replaced in 1968 by another crest. The reason for this crest change is unknown. In 1974 the crest was replaced by a crest which contained the letters NAC in a black and yellow combination. The crest was most probably changed due to the dismissal of the NAC board in 1974. In order to state a new beginning, a new board member's daughter designed NAC's third crest.

The fourth crest was developed in 1996, when NAC moved to the Rat Verlegh Stadion. It consisted of two lions, three crosses, the letters NAC and it contains NAC's official club colours. The two lions and the three crosses are derived from Breda's crest. In 2012, the first crest was re-adopted since, as NAC celebrated its 100th anniversary. Eventually upon initiative (and paid for) by the fans it was decided to reinstate the first crest permanently.

Stadiums

BLO Terrein
Period: 19 September 1912 – 31 July 1913.
Directly after the merger of NOAD and ADVENDO, and thus the foundation of NAC, the board rented the fields of the Bond voor Lichaamlijke Opvoeding to play their homematches. The terrain, located east of the Wilhelmina Park in Breda, was NAC's homeground for one season. Because of the terrain's poor conditions, NAC moved to another terrain.

Achter de Watertoren

Period: 1 August 1913 – 31 July 1916.
For three seasons NAC played at the grounds known as Achter de Watertoren (English: Behind the watertower), located north of the Wilhelmina Park in Breda. During the seasons NAC played at Achter de Watertoren, NAC's popularity increased and the club decided to move for the third time in her existence.

‘t Ploegske

Period: 1 August 1916 – 29 August 1931.
Without no doubt, NAC's biggest successes were at the stadium ‘t Ploegske. In 1921 NAC celebrated the Dutch championship at the stadium. ‘t Ploegske was the first NAC stadium with stands, and a capacity over 3,000, was located at the Molengracht in Breda. Due to the fact Breda's City Council zoned the area as a residential area, NAC were forced to move.

Heuvelstraat

Period: 30 August 1931 – 1 August 1940.
Due to the City Council's decision to zone the grounds of ‘t Ploegske as a residential area and the city of Breda had no new grounds available, NAC were forced to move out Breda. The town of Princenhage offered NAC a terrain, where NAC built a state-of-the-art stadium with a capacity of 5,500. The main disadvantage was that the stadium was located far from Breda's city centre. Nevertheless, NAC's golden decennium in the thirties, when NAC was considered to be one of the top clubs in the Netherlands, took place in the stadium at the Heuvelstraat. In 1939 the city of Breda offered NAC a new terrain at the Beatrixstraat.

Beatrixstraat

Period: 1 August 1940 – 13 May 1996.
Moving to the Beatrixstraat meant a return to NAC's roots. NAC was back in the city where it belonged. NAC's popularity increased and in the fifties and sixties NAC was considered to be one of the biggest clubs in the Netherlands. In the seventies NAC became notorious for their evening matches at this stadium. An intimidating and fierce atmosphere lead to the birth of the ‘Avondje NAC’ (English: Evening NAC), in which NAC's fans fanatically supported their team. The stadium's top capacity was 18,500. Due to strict regulations, it was limited to 12,560 in the nineties. Due to the stadium's age and overdue maintenance, NAC left the stadium in 1996.

Rat Verlegh stadium

Period: 11 August 1996 – Present.
NAC's current ground is the Rat Verlegh stadium, located 2 kilometres north west of Breda's city centre. Founded as the FUJIFILM Stadium, the name was changed in 2003 to the MyCom stadium. From the stadium's opening the NAC fans used the name Rat Verlegh stadium, which was officially assigned by NAC to the stadium in 2006. At present, the stadium's capacity is 17,750. Due to the increasing popularity of NAC Breda, the stadium was expanded in summer 2010 to a capacity of 19,000.

Fans
NAC fans often refer to themselves as ‘The Rats’ or ‘The Yellow Army’. NAC Breda have a loyal fanbase, with virtually all their home matches selling out. National and international NAC is known by the fierce and fanatic support of their fans, combined in the term ‘Avondje NAC’ (English: ‘An evening NAC’). A flamboyant mix of Burgundian fun, beer, fanaticism and love for the club ensures that during home matches the atmosphere in the stadium is intimidating. The term has its roots in the seventies, when the board decided to play their home matches at a Saturday evening. Nowadays, NAC is supported by two fanatic sides: The B-Side and Vak G. The club's fans also publish NAC Fanzine De Rat, named after Antoon ‘Rat’ Verlegh. NAC was the first club in Dutch professional soccer to found a fans' council. This council is an advisory organisation, that protects NAC's culture and defend the fans' interests. NAC also has one position available for a fan in the board of chairmans.

Rivalries
NAC Breda's longest-running and deepest rivalry is with their nearest neighbour, Willem II from Tilburg. This rivalry originated in the 1920s. Matches between the two are referred to as the derby of Brabant. The two cities of Breda and Tilburg are just 20 kilometres apart, leading to an intense feeling of a cross-town rivalry, heightened by a feeling that it is city against city with local pride at stake. The cities differ culturally where Breda is considered a working class city and Tilburg is considered more elitist. This is also apparent from the fact that Willem II is named after a Dutch king.

NAC Breda's other deep running rivalry is with Rotterdam based club Feyenoord. The rivalry has its roots after several incidents between fans of both clubs in the seventies of the 20th century. Although Feyenoord fans don't have the same rival feelings like NAC fans have, matches against Feyenoord are considered to be of the most important and most violent matches of a season.

Organisation

Supervisory board
NAC Breda's supervisory board consists of 7 people.

Management
NAC Breda's management consists of the following people.

Players

Current squad

Out on loan

Retired numbers
13 –  Ferry van Vliet, midfielder (2001–02) – Posthumous honour.

Former coaches

 Ben Affleck (June 1926 – 26 Oct) 
 James Moore (Feb 1927 – 28 April)
 Lou van der Linden (July 1934 – June 41)
 Cor Kools (July 1934 – June 44)
 Antoon Verlegh (July 1934 – June 45)
 Jan Blom (July 1942 – June 47)
 Cor Kools (July 1945 – June 47)
 Joseph Veréb (July 1947 – June 49)
 Jan Blom (July 1949 – June 61)
 Simon Plooijer (July 1961 – July 66)
 Bob Janse (July 1966 – June 68)
 Leo Canjels (July 1968 – June 71)
 Ben Peeters (July 1971 – March 73)
 Henk Wullems (March 1973 – June 75)
 Bob Maaskant (July 1975 – June 77)
 Hans Dorjee (July 1977 – Jan 79)
 Jo Jansen (Jan 1979 – June 83)
 Henk de Jonge (July 1983 – March 84)
 Bob Maaskant (March 1984 – June 86)
 Leen Looyen (July 1986 – June 87)
 Hans Verel (1 July 1987 – 31 March 1990)
 Ton Carton (March 1990 – April 90)
 Cor Pot (April 1990 – Oct 91)
 Jo Jansen (Oct 1991 – June 92)
 Piet de Visser (1 July 1992 – 31 October 1992)
 Ronald Spelbos (11 January 1993 – 30 June 1995)
 Wim Rijsbergen (1 July 1995 – 30 June 1997)
 Herbert Neumann (1 July 1997 – 8 October 1998)
 Ronald Spelbos (13 October 1998 – 22 March 1999)
 Kees Zwamborn (23 March 1999 – 30 June 1999)
 Henk ten Cate (1 July 2000 – 30 June 2003)
 Ton Lokhoff (1 July 2003 – 30 December 2005)
 Cees Lok (2 January 2006 – 23 April 2006)
 John Karelse (int.) (24 April 2006 – 30 June 2006)
 Ernie Brandts (1 July 2006 – 30 June 2008)
 Robert Maaskant (1 July 2008 – 20 August 2010)
 Gert Aandewiel (21 August 2010 – 30 June 2011)
 John Karelse (21 August 2010 – 23 October 2012)
 Adrie Bogers (int.) (23 October 2012 – 21 November 2012)
 Nebojša Gudelj (21 November 2012 – 13 October 2014)
 Eric Hellemons (int.) (13 October 2014 – 2 January 2015)
 Robert Maaskant (2 January 2015 – 6 October 2015)
 Marinus Dijkhuizen (25 October 2015 – 22 December 2016)
 Stijn Vreven (1 January 2017, 2015 – 30 June 2018)
 Mitchell van der Gaag (1 July 2018 – 18 March 2019)
 Ruud Brood  (22 March 2019 – 31 December 2019)
 Willem Weijs (int.)  (1 January 2020 – 24 January 2020)
 Peter Hyballa  (24 January 2020 - 1 May 2020)
 Maurice Steijn  (1 June 2020 – 19 June 2021)
 Edwin de Graaf  (1 Juli 2021 – 31 June 2022)
 Robert Molenaar  (1 Juli 2022 – 27 december 2022)
 Ton Lokhoff (27 december 2022 - 18 januari 2023)
 Peter Hyballa (18 januari 2023 - present)

See also
Dutch football league teams

References

External links
 NAC.nl – Official website of NAC Breda 
 Fanzine The Rat 
 B-side Rats 

 
Association football clubs established in 1912
1912 establishments in the Netherlands
Football clubs in the Netherlands
Football clubs in Breda